

Events 

 January–June 
 January 31 – Portuguese succession crisis of 1580: The death of Henry, King of Portugal, with no direct heirs, leads to conflict between his potential successors, including King Philip II of Spain and Infanta Catherine, Duchess of Braganza.
 March 1 – Michel de Montaigne signs the preface to his most significant work, Essays. They are published later this year.
 March 25 – Iberian Union: King Philip II of Spain becomes King of Portugal under the name Philip I, following the death without heirs of King Henry of Portugal, in a personal union of the crowns, thus maintaining Portuguese independence (in Europe and throughout the Portuguese Empire). The Philippine Dynasty rule lasts until 1640.
 April 6 – The Dover Straits earthquake occurs.
 May – The Lipizzan stud is established by Charles II, Archduke of Austria.
 June – England signs a commercial treaty with the Ottoman Empire.
 June 11 – Juan de Garay founds Buenos Aires.
 June 25 – The Book of Concord, a collection of Lutheran confessional documents, is published.

 July–December 
 July 12 – The Ostrog Bible, the first complete printed Bible translation into a Slavic language (Old Church Slavonic), is first printed at Ostroh in the Polish–Lithuanian Commonwealth (modern-day Ukraine) by Ivan Fyodorov.
 August 25 – Battle of Alcântara: Spanish armies, led by Fernando Álvarez de Toledo, defending the claim of King Philip II of Spain to the Portuguese throne, defeat the armies of Portuguese claimant António, Prior of Crato.
 September 26 – Francis Drake returns to Plymouth, England from his voyage of circumnavigation (westbound) on the Golden Hind, the second completed in a continuous voyage, and the first under its original commander.

 Date unknown 
 The Billy Mitchell volcano, on the island of Bougainville, undergoes a catastrophic eruption (VEI 6).
 The first session of the Jewish Vaad (Council of Four Lands) is held  in Lublin, Poland; 70 delegates of Jewish local qahals meet to discuss taxation, and other issues important to Jewish communities.
 The Old City of Zamość is established in Poland, by Jan Zamoyski.
 Jesuit missionaries arrive at the court of Akbar, ruler of the Mughal Empire.
 A group of English merchants gains the right to trade in Ottoman territory, in return for supplying the sultan with iron, steel, brass and tin for his war with Persia.
 An influenza pandemic sweeps the world, starting in Asia and moving rapidly through Africa, Europe, and eventually the Americas. More than 10% of the population of Rome dies, and whole towns in Spain are depopulated.

Births 

 January 8 – Jens Hermansson Juel, Stattholder of Norway (d. 1634)
 January 12
 Jan Baptist van Helmont, Flemish chemist (d. 1644)
 Alexander Ruthven, Scottish earl (d. 1600)
 January 20 – Stefano Amadei, Italian painter (d. 1644)
 January 29 – Willem Isaacsz Swanenburg, Dutch engraver (d. 1612)
 January 30 – Gundakar, Prince of Liechtenstein, court official in Vienna (d. 1658)
 January – John Smith, English explorer and Virginia settler (d. 1631)
 February – John Digby, 1st Earl of Bristol, English diplomat (d. 1653)
 February 1 – Francis Fane, 1st Earl of Westmorland, English noble (d. 1629)
 February 2 – Jens Bjelke, Norwegian noble (d. 1659)
 February 22 – Charles de l'Aubespine, marquis de Châteauneuf, French diplomat and government official (d. 1653)
 February 24 – Matthias Hoe von Hoenegg, German theologian (d. 1645)
 February 28
 Orazio Giustiniani, Italian Catholic cardinal (d. 1649)
 Giovanni Srofenaur, Italian musician (d. 1634)
 March 31 – Bogislaw XIV, Duke of Pomerania (d. 1637)
 April 8
 Augusta of Denmark, Duchess Consort of Holstein-Gottorp (1596-1616) (d. 1639)
 William Herbert, 3rd Earl of Pembroke, English noble, courtier and patron of the arts (d. 1630)
 April 18 – (baptism) Thomas Middleton, English playwright (d. 1627)
 April 24 – Miguel Avellán, Spanish Catholic prelate, Auxiliary Bishop of Toledo from 1633 (d. 1650)
 May 5
 Johann Faulhaber, German mathematician (d. 1635)
 Richard Webb, English settler in America (d. 1665)
 May 6 – Charles Gonzaga, Duke of Mantua and Montferrat, French noble (d. 1637)
 May 14 – Bassam Al-Soukaria, Lebanese army commander (d. 1667)
 May 30 – Fadrique de Toledo, 1st Marquis of Villanueva de Valdueza, Spanish noble and admiral (d. 1634)
 June 6 – Godefroy Wendelin, Flemish astronomer (d. 1667)
 June 9 – Daniel Heinsius, Dutch scholar (d. 1655)
 June 12 – Adriaan van Stalbemt, Flemish Baroque painter (d. 1662)
 June 14 – Elisabeth Magdalena of Pomerania, German duchess (d. 1649)
 June 26 
 Gaspar de Borja y Velasco, Spanish Catholic cardinal (d. 1645)
 Peter Claver, Spanish Jesuit priest (d. 1654)
 July 5 – Carlo Contarini, Doge of Venice (d. 1656)
 July 6 – Johann Stobäus, German composer (d. 1646)
 July 10 – Humphrey Chetham, English merchant (d. 1653)
 July 18 – Giovanni Giacomo Semenza, Italian painter (d. 1638)
 July 29 – Francesco Mochi, Italian early-Baroque sculptor (d. 1654)
 August 2 – Prince Jeongwon, Korean prince (d. 1619)
 August 19 – Pierre Vernier, French mathematician (d. 1637)
 September 4 – George Percy, English explorer (d. 1632)
 September 14
 Francisco de Quevedo, Spanish writer (d. 1645)
 Robert Gordon of Straloch, Scottish cartographer (d. 1661)
 September 15
 Charles Annibal Fabrot, French lawyer (d. 1659)
 Thomas Fanshawe, English politician (d. 1631)
 September 17 – Countess Charlotte Brabantina of Nassau, Belgian noble (d. 1631)
 September 24 – Elisabeth of Schleswig-Holstein-Sonderburg, Duchess consort of Pomerania (d. 1653)
 October 8 – Gábor Esterházy (1580–1626), Hungarian noble (d. 1626)
 October 12 – Hortensio Félix Paravicino, Spanish preacher and poet from the noble house of Pallavicini (d. 1633)
 October 20 – Peter Crüger, German astronomer and mathematician (d. 1639)
 October 30 – Armand-Nompar de Caumont, duc de La Force, Marshal of France (d. 1675)
 November 9 – Johannes Narssius, Dutch physician and poet (d. 1637)
 December 1 – Nicolas-Claude Fabri de Peiresc, French astronomer (d. 1637)
 December 4
 Samuel Argall, English adventurer and naval officer (d. 1626)
 Nabeshima Katsushige, Japanese daimyō (d. 1657)
 date unknown
 Philipp Clüver, German geographer and historian (d. 1623)
 Francesco Fontana, Italian lawyer and astronomer (d. 1656)
 Dirk Hartog, Dutch ship's captain and explorer (d. 1621)
 Jean Jannon, Swiss-born typefounder (d. 1658)
 Robert Killigrew, English courtier, politician, ambassador and knight (d. 1633)
 Willebrord Snellius, Dutch astronomer and mathematician (d. 1626)
 Raphael Sobiehrd-Mnishovsky, Bohemian lawyer and writer (d. 1644)
 Pierre Vernier, French mathematician and instrument inventor (d. 1637)
 Krzysztof Zbaraski, Polish nobleman (d. 1627)
 George Calvert, 1st Baron Baltimore, English politician and colonizer (d. 1623)
 probable
 William Brabazon, 1st Earl of Meath, English noble (d. 1651)
 Edward Fairfax, English translator (d. 1635)
 Frans Hals, Dutch painter (d. 1666)
 Alexander Leslie, 1st Earl of Leven, Scottish soldier (d. 1661)
 Benjamin, Duke of Soubise, French Huguenot leader (d. 1642)
 Adriana Basile, Italian composer (d. 1640)

Deaths 

 January 5 – Anna Sibylle of Hanau-Lichtenberg, German noblewoman (b. 1542)
 January 18 
 Antonio Scandello, Italian composer (b. 1517)
 Archangelo de' Bianchi, Italian Catholic cardinal (b. 1516)
 January 31 – King Henry of Portugal (b. 1512)
 February 2 – Bessho Nagaharu, Japanese retainer (b. 1558)
 February 24 – Henry FitzAlan, 19th Earl of Arundel, English nobleman (b. 1511)
 April 20 – Francesco Alciati, Italian Catholic cardinal (b. 1522)
 May 3 – Thomas Tusser, English poet and farmer (b. c. 1524)
 May 31 – Dorothea of Denmark, Electress Palatine, Princess of Denmark, Sweden and Norway (b. 1520)
 June 10 – Luís de Camões, Portuguese poet (b. c. 1524)
 June 18 – Juliana of Stolberg, German countess (b. 1506)
 August 1 – Albrecht Giese, German politician and diplomat (b. 1524)
 August 12 – Luca Longhi, Italian painter (b. 1507)
 August 15 – Vincenzo Borghini, Italian monk (b. 1515)
 August 19 – Andrea Palladio, Italian architect (b. 1508)
 August 20 – Jerónimo Osório, Portuguese historian (b. 1506)
 August 28 – Antonín Brus z Mohelnice, Moravian Catholic archbishop (b. 1518)
 August 30 – Emmanuel Philibert, Duke of Savoy (b. 1528)
 September 19 – Catherine Brandon, Duchess of Suffolk, English noblewoman (b. 1519)
 September 20 – Honorat II of Savoy, French Navy admiral (b. 1511)
 September – Anne de Pisseleu d'Heilly, French royal mistress and cultural patron (b. 1508)
 October 1 – John II, Duke of Schleswig-Holstein-Haderslev (b. 1521)
 October 5 – Matsudaira Shigeyoshi, Japanese general (b. 1493)
 October 8 – Hieronymus Wolf, German historian (b. 1516)
 October 26 – Anna of Austria, Queen of Spain (b. 1549)
 November 3 – Jerónimo Zurita y Castro, Spanish historian (b. 1512)
 November 16 – Marie of Baden-Sponheim, German noblewoman (b. 1507
 November 30 – Richard Farrant, English composer (b. 1530)
 December 1 – Giovanni Morone, Italian Catholic cardinal (b. 1509)
 date unknown
 Giovanni Filippo Ingrassia, Italian anatomist (b. 1545)
 Ruy López de Segura, Spanish priest and writer on chess (b. 1530)
 Inés de Suárez, Spanish conquistadora (b. 1507)
  Lucrezia Galletta, Italian courtesan and banker
 possible date
 John Heywood, English dramatist (b. 1497)
 Robert Lindsay of Pitscottie, Scottish chronicler (b. c. 1532)

References